The 1971 Stockholm Open was a tennis tournament played on hard courts and part of the 1971 Pepsi-Cola Grand Prix and took place in Stockholm, Sweden. The tournament was held from November 1 through November 7, 1971. Stan Smith and Tom Gorman defeated  Arthur Ashe and Bob Lutz, 6–4, 6–3, in the final.

Seeds

  Tom Okker /  Marty Riessen (quarterfinals)
  Roy Emerson /  Rod Laver (second round)

Draw

Finals

Top half

Bottom half

References

Stockholm Open
1971 Grand Prix (tennis)